The Diocese of North Queensland is a diocese of the Anglican Church of Australia, founded in 1879. It is situated in the northern part of the state of Queensland, Australia. As part of the Province of Queensland, it covers the Torres Strait Islands in the north, the entire Cape York Peninsula and the cities of Mount Isa,  Cairns, Townsville and Mackay. The diocesan cathedral is St James' Cathedral, Townsville. The Bishop of North Queensland is Keith Ronald Joseph, who was consecrated and installed on 31 March 2019.

Structure
There are 54 parishes in the diocese, supported by 120 licensed clergy as of February 2015. The diocese owns and operates St Mark's College, a residential college for men and women at James Cook University, Townsville.

The diocese extends its pastoral care through the following ministries:  
 Anglicare North Queensland 
 The Good Shepherd Nursing Home, Townsville (co-trustee) 
 The Good Shepherd Lodge (Aged Persons Home), Mackay 
The Diocese of North Queensland supports of Wontulp-bi-Buya College in Cairns which specialises in indigenous adult education including theological studies. This college is an ecumenical venture and is the Queensland partner of Nungalinya College, Darwin.

The Bishop of North Queensland is Keith Ronald Joseph, who was consecrated and installed on 31 March 2019.

Early history of the diocese

Prior to the establishment of the Diocese of North Queensland, the Anglican Diocese of Sydney had responsibility for all areas of Australia outside a diocese.

The Anglican Church commenced its ministry in the region in 1870 with the arrival in Townsville of James Adams, newly graduated from Moore Theological College in Sydney. As there were no church building in Townsville, services were conducted in the Townsville Court House until Adams could arrange for a church to be constructed.

The Diocese of North Queensland was established in 1879 from that part of the Diocese of Sydney lying north of 22°S latitude in the State of Queensland. In 1900 the Diocese of Carpentaria was formed from part of the northern area of the diocese, but in 1996 this action was reversed.

Bishops

Assistant bishops

Assistant bishops serving the Aboriginal people
 Arthur Malcolm (bishop 1985–2000)
 Jim Leftwich (bishop 2001–2010)

Assistant bishops serving the Torres Strait Islander people
 Ted Mosby (bishop 1997–2000)
 Saibo Mabo (bishop 2002–2015)

Other assistant bishops
Grosvenor Miles, who had been assistant bishop of Madagascar from 1938 to 1960, was assistant bishop of North Queensland from 1962 to his death in 1978. His ashes are interred under the High Altar of St James' Cathedral, Townsville.
 George Tung Yep: on 12 October 1985, John Grindrod, Archbishop of Brisbane consecrated George Tung Yep (hitherto archdeacon) and Arthur Malcolm (Arthur Alistair Malcolm ; hitherto a canon) assistant bishops of the diocese. Tung Yep was ordained on 10 February 1955, and was appointed regional bishop in 1988.
Ian Stuart served as an Assistant Bishop of North Queensland from his 1992 consecration until 1998, during which time he was also, in a vacancy in the diocesan See, Bishop Administrator.

References

External links 
 Diocese of North Queensland website
 St James' Cathedral website

North Queensland
North Queensland
Christianity in Queensland
Anglican Church of Australia Ecclesiastical Province of Queensland